Ipota Airport  is an airfield near Ipota on the island of Erromango, in the Taféa province in Vanuatu. It is one of two airfields in the island, the other being Dillon's Bay Airport in the west.

Facilities

Airlines and destinations

References

External links
 

Airports in Vanuatu
Tafea Province